Kings Park or King's Park may refer to:

Populated places
 King's Park, Glasgow, a district
 King's Park, Hong Kong, a neighborhood in the Kowloon area
 King's Park (constituency), a constituency of Hong Kong
 King's Park (ward), an electoral ward in the London Borough of Hackney
 Kings Park, New South Wales, a suburb of Sydney
 Kings Park, New York, a census-designated place on Long Island
 Kings Park, South Australia, a suburb of Adelaide
 Kings Park, Victoria, a suburb of Melbourne
 Kings Park, Virginia, a suburban community west of Washington, D.C.

Parks
 Kings Park, Boscombe
 Kings Park, Western Australia, in Perth
King's Park, in Winnipeg (Fort Richmond area)

Other uses
 King's Park F.C., a defunct football club in Stirling, Scotland
 Kings Park Psychiatric Center, a former mental institution located in Kings Park, New York
 Kings Park Sporting Precinct, Durban, South Africa
 Kings Park Stadium, a rugby stadium in Durban, South Africa